Tremper may refer to:

People
George Nelson Tremper (1877–1958), American educator
George Nelson Tremper High School, or Tremper High School, in Kenosha, Wisconsin, U.S.
Overton Tremper (1906–1996), American baseball player
Will Tremper (1928–1998), German journalist and filmmaker
Tremper Longman, American theologian and author

Places
Mount Tremper, or Tremper Mountain, one of the Catskill Mountains in New York, U.S.
Mount Tremper, New York, a hamlet
Tremper Mound and Works, in Scioto County, Ohio, U.S.

See also

Temper (disambiguation)
Tremp, a municipality in Catalonia, Spain
Trevemper, a hamlet in Cornwall, UK